The Orange River francolin (Scleroptila gutturalis) is a species of bird in the family Phasianidae found in grassland and woodland in Africa. In the taxa from the northern part of its distribution (Ethiopia, South Sudan, Somalia, Uganda and Kenya), the neck-line does not reach the eye and the belly is whitish. In the southern taxa (Angola, Namibia, Botswana, South Africa and Lesotho) the neck-line reaches the eye and the belly is buff. This has led some authorities to treat them as separate species: The Archer's or acacia francolin (S. gutturalis with subspecies lorti) in the north, and the Orange River francolin (S. levaillantoides with subspecies jugularis) in the south.

References

External links
 Orange River Francolin - Species text in The Atlas of Southern African Birds

Orange River francolin
Birds of East Africa
Birds of Southern Africa
Orange River francolin
Taxonomy articles created by Polbot